Mildred Adams Fenton (November 14, 1899 – December 7, 1995) trained in paleontology and geology at the University of Iowa.  She coauthored dozens of general science books with her husband, Carroll Lane Fenton, including Records of Evolution (1924), Land We Live On (1944), and Worlds in the Sky (1963).

Early life and education
Mildred Adams was born near West Branch, Iowa, the daughter of Ollie M. Adams and Mary Ann Yetter Adams. She graduated from the University of Chicago, where she met her husband Carroll Lane Fenton while they were both undergraduates.

Selected publications 
In addition to their scholarly contributions, the couple wrote fifty books on general science topics, and her photographs were often used as illustrations. Unless otherwise indicated, Fenton was co-author on the following articles and books, with her husband Carroll Lane Fenton.

Scholarly works 

 "Some Black River Brachiopods from the Mississippi Valley" (1922)
 "Nortonechinus, a Devonian Echinoid" (1923)
 The Stratigraphy and Fauna of the Hackberry Stage of the Upper Devonian (1925)
 "A New Species of Schizophoria from the Devonian of Iowa" (1928)
 "Notes on Several forms of Lichenocrinus from Black River Formations" (1929, solo author)
 "Some Snail Borings of Paleozoic Age" (1931)
 "Boring Sponges in the Devonian of Iowa" (1932)
 "Orientation and Injury in the Genus Atrypa" (1932)
 "Hail Prints and Mud-Cracks of Proterozoic Age" (1933)
 "Algal Reefs or Bioherms in the Belt Series of Montana" (1933)
 "Atrypae described by Clement L. Webster and related forms (Devonian, Iowa)" (1935)
 "Burrows and Trails from Pennsylvanian Rocks of Texas" (1937)
 "Belt Series of the North: Stratigraphy, Sedimentation, Paleontology" (1937)
 "Archaeonassa: Cambrian Snail Trails and Burrows" (1937)
 "Pre-Cambrian and Paleozoic Algae" (1939)

General science books 

 Records of Evolution (1924)
 The World of Fossils (1933)
 The Rock Book
 Land We Live On (1944)
 Rocks and Their Stories (1951)
 Riches from the Earth (1953)
 The Fossil Book: A Record of Prehistoric Life (1958)
 Worlds in the Sky (1963)
 Mountains (1969)

Personal life 
Mildred Adams and Carroll Lane Fenton married in 1921. The couple established a scholarship fund for Hopi students at Northern Arizona University. She was president of the New Jersey and Iowa chapters of the Daughters of Founders and Patriots of America. She traveled extensively in her later years, including several trips to Australia and a visit to Russia. Carroll died in 1969, and she died in 1995, at the age of 96, in Iowa City.

References

External links
Flickr entry (with discussion on birth date) 
S. George Pemberton and James A. MacEachern (1994).  "Carroll Lane Fenton and Mildred Adams Fenton:  Pioneers of North American Neoichnology," Ichnos:  An International Journal for Plant and Animal Traces 3(2):  145-153.

20th-century American geologists
American paleontologists
1899 births
1995 deaths
American geographers
Women paleontologists
People from West Branch, Iowa
20th-century American zoologists
20th-century American women scientists
20th-century geographers
Women geographers
American women geologists